Josy Polfer (9 May 1929 – 21 January 1976) was a Luxembourgian racing cyclist. He rode in the 1951 Tour de France.

References

External links
 

1929 births
1976 deaths
Luxembourgian male cyclists
Place of birth missing